Martin Breadmore (born 1967) has been the Archdeacon of Dorking in the Church of England since November 2019.

Breadmore was educated at London University and ordained in 1994. After a curacy in Herne Bay he was at St Paul, Camberley. He was Director for Ministry for the Kensington Area of the Diocese of London from 2010 until his appointment as Archdeacon.

References

1967 births
Alumni of the University of London
Archdeacons of Dorking
Living people